Nelson Dock can refer to a number of places:

 Nelson Dock, Liverpool, dock on the River Mersey and part of the Port of Liverpool
 Nelson Dock, Rotherhithe, dock on the River Thames in London
 Nelson Dock Pier, pier on Nelson Dock